Netolický (feminine Netolická) is a Czech toponymic surname, derived from the town of Netolice. Notable people include:

 Bob Netolicky, American basketball player
 Josef Štěpánek Netolický, Czech fishpond builder and architect
 Marek Netolický, Slovak footballer
 Martin Netolický, Czech politician

Czech-language surnames
Toponymic surnames